"Let Me In" is the debut single by Young Buck, from his debut album, Straight Outta Cashville. It features 50 Cent and is produced by Needlz. The music video features cameo appearances by Lloyd Banks, Juvenile, Olivia, Stat Quo, David Banner, Slim Thug, Daz Dillinger, C-Note and D-Red from Botany Boyz and Lil Scrappy. B-Real from Cypress Hill freestyled to the song's beat for his song "Let Me Blaze" on his debut mixtape "The Gunslinger".

Background
"Let Me In" peaked at number 34 on the Billboard Hot 100. Fellow G-Unit member, 50 Cent, contributes to the song.

Track listing 
Digital download

CD single

Charts

Weekly charts

Year-end charts

Release history

References

External links 
 

2004 singles
Young Buck songs
2004 songs
Songs written by 50 Cent
G-Unit Records singles
Song recordings produced by Needlz
Songs written by Needlz
Songs written by Young Buck
Crunk songs